James Lee Holifield (born January 18, 1946) is a former American football player and coach. He was selected by the New York Giants in the 1968 NFL/AFL Draft and played with the Giants in the National Football League (NFL) from 1968 to 1969. Holifield served as the head football coach at Miles College in Fairfield, Alabama from 1972 to 1974.

References

External links
 

1946 births
Living people
American football defensive backs
Jackson State Tigers football players
Miles Golden Bears football coaches
New York Giants players
Sportspeople from Bessemer, Alabama
Players of American football from Alabama